Pampa del Tamarugal ("Plateau of the Tamarugal") is a vast plain encompassing a significant portion of the Norte Grande, Chile, and originally named for the Prosopis tamarugo trees that used to cover its surface. It is located between the parallels 19°30’ and 22°15’ south latitude and is considered part of the Atacama Desert. It is bounded on the west by the Chilean Coastal Range and on the east by the western slopes of the Andes.  The plain occupies a surface area of 12,500 km2 with an average elevation of 1,100 m.

Tourism 
Among the major tourist attractions in the Pampa del Tamarugal are the world heritage site Humberstone and Santa Laura Saltpeter Works, the town of La Tirana, and the Pampa del Tamarugal National Reserve.

Gallery

See also
Pampa del Tamarugal Aquifer
Pulpería

References 

Geography of Tarapacá Region
Landforms of Tarapacá Region
Atacama Desert
Forests of Chile
Plains of Chile